Henry Wadsworth (June 18, 1903 – December 5, 1974) was an American actor best known for appearing in Applause (1929),  The Thin Man (1934), and Mark of the Vampire (1935).

Early life 
Joseph Henry Wadsworth was born on June 18, 1903 to John Gray Wadsworth and Ida Power Wadsworth, who were married in 1894. Henry Wadsworth's ancestors first arrived in Hartford, Connecticut from England in 1632. He was the grandson of William Henry Wadsworth, who was a well-known lawyer, orator, and congressman.

Wadsworth attended the University of Kentucky after graduating from Maysville High School in 1921.

He enrolled in Carnegie Institute of Technology's drama school before starting his acting career.

Career 
Wadsworth made his first appearance in film in the title role of Howard Lindsay's Tommy in late 1927, following which he went on to appear in films like Applause, made under Paramount production. The film also marked Helen Morgan's debut.

He played minor roles in Operator 13 (alongside Marion Davies) and in Fast and Loose before starring in W.S. Van Dyke's The Thin Man. He also appeared in The Voice of Bugle Ann, This Side of Heaven, All-Legit Cast, Mark of the Vampire, Sitting on the Moon, and Dr. Kildare Goes Home.

Wadsworth was cast in The Big Broadcast series' The Big Broadcast of 1936.

He retired from acting in the late 1950s; his last appearance was in Rodgers and Hammerstein's The Happy Time alongside Leora Dana and Eva Gabor. He joined the US Navy during World War II and remained there for two and a half years.

Death 
Wadsworth died on December 5, 1974 at St. Luke's Hospital, New York City, at the age of 71.

Filmography

References

External links

1903 births
1974 deaths
American male film actors
American male stage actors
People from Maysville, Kentucky